The Davari Shahnameh or Shahnameh-ye Davari is a 1856 manuscript of the Shahnameh by Ferdowsi. Created by Mohammad ibn Vesal (pen name "Davari"; 1822–1865) in 19th-century Qajar Iran, it is one of the last Shahnamehs made in the traditional style. It is stored at the Reza Abbasi Museum in Tehran, Iran under accession number 599. Majestically decorated and consisting of 68 illustrations, the Davari Shahnameh is comparable to courtly productions of the Shahnameh. However, unlike courtly productions, the Davari Shahnameh was not a commissioned work. According to art historian Massoumeh (Nahid) Assemi, the Davari Shahnameh may have been created "as an ode to a dying art".

See also
 Qajar art

Sources
 

Manuscripts of Shahnameh
19th-century manuscripts
Islamic illuminated manuscripts
Qajar Iran